John McGrath (born 21 March 1932) is an English former footballer who made 79 appearances in the Football League playing as an inside forward for Notts County and Darlington in the 1950s. He also played non-league football for Guisborough Town. He was on the books of Aldershot as an amateur, but never represented them in the league, and later played in the Southern League for Boston United.

References

1932 births
Living people
People from Tidworth
English footballers
Association football inside forwards
Aldershot F.C. players
Notts County F.C. players
Darlington F.C. players
Boston United F.C. players
English Football League players